Taush (Tıwış) is a rural locality (a village) in Kaltymanovsky Selsoviet, Iglinsky District, Bashkortostan, Russia. The population was 23 as of 2010. There are 2 streets.

Geography 
Taush is located 12 km south of Iglino (the district's administrative centre) by road. Novaya Beryozovka is the nearest rural locality.

References 

Rural localities in Iglinsky District